is a Japanese football player currently playing for Fujieda MYFC.

Career statistics
Updated to end of 2018 season.

National team career statistics

Appearances in major competitions

References

External links
Profile at Oita Trinita

1989 births
Living people
Association football people from Fukuoka Prefecture
Japanese footballers
J1 League players
J2 League players
J3 League players
Avispa Fukuoka players
Tokyo Verdy players
Oita Trinita players
Fujieda MYFC players
Association football midfielders